The Punta Bes  is a 3,177 metres high mountain belonging to the Italian side of Graian Alps.

Geography
The mountain is located on the border between Piedmont and Aosta Valley, on the watershed dividing Valle dell'Orco from Valsavarenche, the latter tributary of the Dora Baltea. A 3.112 m high saddle divides Punta bes from Punta Leynir, while the Orco/Valsavarenche ridge continues towards the Colle del Nivolet. The Punta Bes, due to its location, offers a good view on the nearby massif of Gran Paradiso.

SOIUSA classification 
According to SOIUSA (International Standardized Mountain Subdivision of the Alps) the mountain can be classified in the following way:
 main part = Western Alps
 major sector = North Western Alps
 section = Graian Alps
 subsection = Central Graian Alps
 supergroup = Catena Grande Sassière-Tsanteleina
 group = Costiera Galisia-Entrelor-Bioula
 code = I/B-7.III-A.1

Access to the summit 
The mountain can be accessed from Nivolet Pass (2.641 m); this route requires a good hiking experience. Along with Punta Bes many hikers also climb the nearby Punta Leynir.

Mountain huts 
 Refuge Città di Chivasso (2,604 m).
 Rifugio Albergo Savoia (2,534 m).

Nature protection 
Punta Bes belongs to the Parco Nazionale del Gran Paradiso.

Maps
 Istituto Geografico Militare (IGM) official maps of Italy, 1:25.000 and 1:100.000 scale, on-line version
 Carta dei sentieri e dei rifugi scala 1:50.000 n. 3 Il Parco Nazionale del Gran Paradiso, Istituto Geografico Centrale - Torino

References

Alpine three-thousanders
Mountains of Aosta Valley
Mountains of Piedmont
Mountains of the Graian Alps